The Craig School is an independent, private coeducational day school located in Mountain Lakes and Montville, in Morris County, New Jersey, United States, serving students in second through twelfth grades.

In the 2015-16 school year, the Lower School (grades 2-8 in Mountain Lakes) had 109 students and the High School (grades 9-12 in Boonton) had 28 students. 
As of the 2019–20 school year, the school had an enrollment of 127 students and 46.9 classroom teachers (on an FTE basis), for a student–teacher ratio of 2.7:1. The school's student body was 80.3% (102) White, 9.4% (12) Black, 6.3% (8) Asian, 2.4% (3) Hispanic and 1.6% (2) two or more races. The Lower School director is Janet Cozine, the High School director is Dr. Eric Caparulo, and Dr. Kara A. Loftin is the Head of School.

The Craig School was founded in 1980. The school specializes in the education of children who have encountered difficulty succeeding in the traditional classroom environment. The Craig School specializes in students limited to dyslexia, auditory processing disorder and attention-deficit hyperactivity disorder, using a language-based curriculum. The Craig High School was added in 2000. In 2013, The Craig High School moved to new shared facilities at the Boonton High School.

In September 2015, the school acquired its current Lower and Middle School facilities, and administrative building, located in Mountain Lakes, New Jersey, from The Wilson School (which is now defunct). Following the purchase, The Craig School will begin a renovation program on the Mountain Lakes facilities, including the expansion of the school's Orton Gillingham teaching wing for students with dyslexia and related academic learning disabilities, science lab and technology teaching areas and art studio space. A new state-of-the-art occupational therapy room is also in the preliminary plan.  The renovation program, which will be managed to avoid operational disruption, is expected to be completed by September 2016.

Accreditation
The school has been accredited by the Middle States Association of Colleges and Schools Commission on Elementary and Secondary Schools since 2002and is accredited until July 2027. The Craig School is a member of the National Association of Independent Schools and New Jersey Association of Independent Schools.

In 2010, The Craig High School formed its own chapter of the National Honor Society, and in 2012, formed its own chapter of the National Art Honor Society.

Athletics
On three Fridays during the month of January and into February, students are taken to ski or snowboard at Mount Peter in Warwick, New York, as part of the physical education program.

References

External links
The Craig School
The Craig School, National Center for Education Statistics

1980 establishments in New Jersey
Educational institutions established in 1980
Boonton, New Jersey
Mountain Lakes, New Jersey
Private elementary schools in New Jersey
Private middle schools in New Jersey
Private high schools in Morris County, New Jersey